Galasodes is a monotypic snout moth genus described by Hans Georg Amsel in 1956. Its only species, Galasodes nervosella, described by the same author, is found in Venezuela.

References

Chrysauginae
Monotypic moth genera
Moths of South America
Pyralidae genera
Taxa named by Hans Georg Amsel